Valeriia Aprielieva (born 1 February 1997) is a Ukrainian synchronised swimmer. She is World Championships medalist.

Career
Aprielieva won two bronze medals at the inaugural European Games where she was third in team and combination competitions. 

At the 2017 World Aquatics Championships Aprielieva won a bronze medal in team free routine. The next day she won silver in the combination event.

References

1997 births
Living people
Ukrainian synchronized swimmers
World Aquatics Championships medalists in synchronised swimming
Synchronized swimmers at the 2017 World Aquatics Championships
European Aquatics Championships medalists in synchronised swimming
European Games medalists in synchronised swimming
European Games bronze medalists for Ukraine
Synchronised swimmers at the 2015 European Games
Sportspeople from Kharkiv Oblast
21st-century Ukrainian women